Word Wars is a 2004 documentary film directed by Eric Chaikin and Julian Petrillo about competitive Scrabble playing.
Its full title is: Word Wars - Tiles and Tribulations on the Scrabble Circuit. The film was an official selection at the 2004 Sundance film festival, had a 25-city theatrical run, was included as part of the Discovery Times Channel's "Screening Room" series, and was nominated for numerous awards including a 2004 Documentary Emmy for "Best Artistic or Cultural Programming" and an International Documentary Association (IDA) Award. The film is distributed by 7th Art Releasing.

The film follows four players in the nine months leading up to the 2002 National Scrabble Championship, which was held in San Diego, California: Joe Edley, Matt Graham, Marlon Hill, and Joel Sherman. These players also appear in Stefan Fatsis's book Word Freak, as does Chaikin. Fatsis and Chaikin are both tournament Scrabble players themselves.

Soundtrack 
 E Wolf & the Moneylenders - "Paralyzed" (Written by Chalkin & Haber)
 Your Mom - "The One" (Written by Your Mom)
 The Minutemen - "Do You Want New Wave (Or Do You Want the Truth)" (Written by Mike Watt)
 The Minutemen - "The Glory of Man" (Written by Mike Watt)
 Andrew Chaikin & Austin Willacy - "Across the Universe" (Written by John Lennon and Paul McCartney)
 Joel Sherman - "Across the Universe" (Written by John Lennon and Paul McCartney)

References

External links

Documentary films about words and language
Works about Scrabble
2004 films
2004 documentary films
American documentary films
Documentary films about competitions
Films shot in Baltimore
2000s English-language films
2000s American films